Ede Višinka (born 19 May 1972) is a Serbian-Hungarian football manager and former player. He is the manager of Nyíregyháza.

Playing career
While playing for Red Star Belgrade, Višinka won the FR Yugoslavia Cup in the 1996–97 season. He later played for Napredak Kruševac in the Second League of FR Yugoslavia, as well as for Rad and Obilić in the First League of FR Yugoslavia. Between 2003 and 2008, Višinka spent five seasons with Mladost Apatin, before moving abroad to Iceland. He ended his career after playing in the amateur leagues of Hungary.

Managerial career
In June 2019, Višinka became manager of Nemzeti Bajnokság II club Aqvital FC Csákvár, spending two seasons in charge. He was then appointed as manager of Tiszakécskei LC in August 2021.

Honours
Red Star Belgrade
 FR Yugoslavia Cup: 1996–97

References

External links
 
 

1972 births
Living people
Sportspeople from Sombor
Serbian people of Hungarian descent
Yugoslav footballers
Serbia and Montenegro footballers
Serbian footballers
Hungarian footballers
Association football defenders
FK Proleter Zrenjanin players
Red Star Belgrade footballers
FK Napredak Kruševac players
FK Rad players
Hapoel Be'er Sheva F.C. players
FK Obilić players
FK Mladost Apatin players
Kecskeméti TE players
First League of Serbia and Montenegro players
Second League of Serbia and Montenegro players
Israeli Premier League players
Serbian SuperLiga players
Serbian First League players
Serbia and Montenegro expatriate footballers
Serbian expatriate footballers
Expatriate footballers in Hungary
Expatriate footballers in Israel
Expatriate footballers in Iceland
Serbia and Montenegro expatriate sportspeople in Hungary
Serbia and Montenegro expatriate sportspeople in Israel
Serbian expatriate sportspeople in Iceland
Serbian football managers
Hungarian football managers
Nyíregyháza Spartacus FC managers